John Wynne (1720 – January 1778) was an Irish politician.

He sat in the House of Commons of Ireland from 1751 to 1776, as a Member of Parliament for Sligo Borough 1751–60, for Leitrim 1761–68, and for Sligo Borough again 1768–76.

References 
 

1710 births
1778 deaths
Irish MPs 1727–1760
Irish MPs 1761–1768
Irish MPs 1769–1776
Members of the Parliament of Ireland (pre-1801) for County Sligo constituencies
Members of the Parliament of Ireland (pre-1801) for County Leitrim constituencies